Bismuth pentafluoride is an inorganic compound with the formula BiF5.  It is a white solid that is highly reactive.  The compound is of interest to researchers but not of particular value.

Structure
BiF5 is polymeric and consists of linear chains of trans-bridged corner sharing BiF6 octahedra. This is the same structure as α-UF5.

Preparation
BiF5 can be prepared by treating BiF3 with F2 at 500 °C.

BiF3 + F2 → BiF5

In an alternative synthesis, ClF3 is the fluorinating agent at 350 °C.

BiF3 + ClF3 → BiF5 + ClF

Reactions
Bismuth pentafluoride is the most reactive of the pnictogen pentafluorides and is an extremely strong fluorinating agent. It reacts vigorously with water to form ozone and oxygen difluoride, and with iodine or sulfur at room temperature. BiF5 fluorinates paraffin oil (hydrocarbons) to fluorocarbons above 50 °C and oxidises UF4 to UF6 at 150 °C. At 180 °C, bismuth pentafluoride fluorinates Br2 to BrF3 and Cl2 to ClF.

BiF5 also reacts with alkali metal fluorides, MF, to form hexafluorobismuthates, M[BiF6], containing the hexafluorobismuthate anion, [BiF6]−.

References

Bismuth compounds
Fluorides
Metal halides
Oxidizing agents
Fluorinating agents
Inorganic polymers
Coordination polymers